This is a list of notable footballers who have played for Southend United. The aim is for this list to include all players that have played 200 or more senior matches for the club. Other players who have played an important role for the club can be included, but the reason why they have been included should be added in the "Notes" column.

For a list of all Southend United players, major or minor, with a Wikipedia article, see Category:Southend United F.C. players, and for the current squad see the main Southend United F.C. article.

Players are listed according to the date of their first team debut. Appearances and goals are for first-team competitive matches only; wartime matches are excluded. Substitute appearances included.

Table

As of 25 May 2013.

References

 
Southend United F.C.
Southend United F.C.
Association football player non-biographical articles